Whitney Mansion is a historic home located at Niagara Falls in Niagara County, New York.  It is a two-story Greek Revival stone structure built in 1849 by the son of General Parkhurst Whitney, a village founder and owner of the Cataract House and The Eagle Tavern. The structure features a two-story pedimented porch with four heavy Ionic columns.  It is located overlooking the Niagara River, just above the American Falls.  It is now contains law offices.

It was listed on the National Register of Historic Places in 1974.

References

External links
Whitney Mansion - U.S. National Register of Historic Places on Waymarking.com

Historic American Buildings Survey in New York (state)
Houses on the National Register of Historic Places in New York (state)
Houses completed in 1849
Greek Revival houses in New York (state)
Houses in Niagara County, New York
Buildings and structures in Niagara Falls, New York
1849 establishments in New York (state)
National Register of Historic Places in Niagara County, New York